Agnidra corticata is a moth in the family Drepanidae. It was described by Warren in 1922. It is found in north-eastern India and China (Sichuan).

Subspecies
Agnidra corticata corticata (north-eastern India)
Agnidra corticata francki Watson, 1968 (China: Sichuan)

References

Moths described in 1922
Drepaninae
Moths of Asia